Eduardo Ariel Bustos Montoya (born October 3, 1976 in Rosario) is a former Argentine football striker.

Club career
He has previously played for a number of clubs in Argentina, most notably Rosario Central where he was part of the squad that won the Copa CONMEBOL in 1995.

Nicknamed Tati, Bustos Montoya has played for a number of clubs outside Argentina, including Feyenoord in the Netherlands, Atlas of Mexico, Avispa Fukuoka of Japan, 12 de Octubre of Paraguay and Levadiakos of Greece.

Club statistics

External links
 Guardian statistics
 Eduardo Bustos Montoya – Argentine Primera statistics at Fútbol XXI 
 

1976 births
Living people
Argentine footballers
Association football forwards
Rosario Central footballers
Feyenoord players
Atlas F.C. footballers
Avispa Fukuoka players
Chacarita Juniors footballers
Club Atlético Lanús footballers
Club Atlético Banfield footballers
Club Atlético Independiente footballers
Quilmes Atlético Club footballers
Levadiakos F.C. players
J1 League players
Eredivisie players
Liga MX players
Argentine Primera División players
Super League Greece players
Argentine expatriate footballers
Expatriate footballers in the Netherlands
Argentine expatriate sportspeople in the Netherlands
Expatriate footballers in Mexico
Argentine expatriate sportspeople in Mexico
Expatriate footballers in Japan
Argentine expatriate sportspeople in Japan
Expatriate footballers in Paraguay
Argentine expatriate sportspeople in Paraguay
Expatriate footballers in Greece
Argentine expatriate sportspeople in Greece
Footballers from Rosario, Santa Fe